Ramón Caraballo Sánchez (born May 23, 1969) is a former Major League Baseball player and current Hitting coach for the DSL Orioles. He played two season with the Atlanta Braves and St. Louis Cardinals in 1993 and 1995.

References

External links

1969 births
Atlanta Braves players
Burlington Braves players
Dominican Republic baseball coaches
Dominican Republic expatriate baseball players in the United States
Durham Bulls players
Greenville Braves players
Gulf Coast Braves players
Iowa Cubs players

Living people
Louisville Redbirds players
Major League Baseball second basemen
Major League Baseball players from the Dominican Republic
Minor league baseball coaches
Richmond Braves players
Sumter Braves players
St. Louis Cardinals players